Finta v levo is a novel by Slovenian author Ivan Sivec. It was first published in 2002.

See also
List of Slovenian novels

Slovenian novels
2002 novels